The 2019–20 UEFA Youth League Domestic Champions Path began on 2 October and ended on 4 December 2019. A total of 32 teams compete in the Domestic Champions Path to decide eight of the 24 places in the knockout phase (play-offs and the round of 16 onwards) of the 2019–20 UEFA Youth League.

Times are CET/CEST, as listed by UEFA (local times, if different, are in parentheses).

Draw
The youth domestic champions of the top 32 associations according to their 2018 UEFA country coefficients entered the Domestic Champions Path. If there was a vacancy (associations with no youth domestic competition, as well as youth domestic champions already included in the UEFA Champions League path), it was first filled by the title holders should they have not yet qualified, and then by the youth domestic champions of the next association in the UEFA ranking.

For the Domestic Champions Path, the 32 teams were drawn into two rounds of two-legged home-and-away ties. The draw for both the first round and second round was held on 3 September 2019, 14:00 CEST, at the UEFA headquarters in Nyon, Switzerland. There were no seedings, but the 32 teams were split into groups defined by sporting and geographical criteria prior to the draw.
In the first round, the 32 teams were split into four groups. Teams in the same group were drawn against each other, with the order of legs decided by draw.
In the second round, the sixteen winners of the first round, whose identity was not known at the time of the draw, were split into two groups: Group A contained the winners from Groups 1 and 2, while Group B contained the winners from Groups 3 and 4. Teams in the same group were drawn against each other, with the order of legs decided by draw.

Format
In both rounds, if the aggregate score was tied after full time of the second leg, the away goals rule was used to decide the winner. If still tied, the match was decided by a penalty shoot-out (no extra time was played). The eight second round winners advanced to the play-offs, where they were joined by the eight group runners-up from the UEFA Champions League Path (group stage).

First round

The first legs were played on 2, 3, 5 and 9 October, and the second legs were played from 22–24 October 2019.

|}
Notes

APOEL won 2–1 on aggregate.

Sheriff Tiraspol won 3–1 on aggregate.

Zrinjski Mostar won 3–1 on aggregate.

Zaragoza won 5–1 on aggregate.

Derby County won 9–2 on aggregate.

Midtjylland won 3–1 on aggregate.

Sogndal won 4–2 on aggregate.

ÍA won 16–1 on aggregate.

PAOK won 2–1 on aggregate.

Rennes won 2–1 on aggregate.

5–5 on aggregate. Rangers won on away goals.

Porto won 7–2 on aggregate.

Domžale won 2–0 on aggregate.

1–1 on aggregate. Slovan Bratislava won 4–2 on penalties.

Dynamo Kyiv won 10–2 on aggregate.

Maccabi Petah Tikva won 4–1 on aggregate.

Second round

The first legs were played on 4 and 6 November, and the second legs were played from 26–27 November and 4 December 2019.

|}

3–3 on aggregate. Sheriff Tiraspol won on away goals.

Zaragoza won 9–0 on aggregate.

Midtjylland won 3–1 on aggregate.

Derby County won 6–2 on aggregate.

Porto won 5–2 on aggregate.

Dynamo Kyiv won 5–2 on aggregate.

Rangers won 4–1 on aggregate.

Rennes won 3–0 on aggregate.

Notes

References

External links

UEFA Youth League Matches: 2019–20, UEFA.com

2
October 2019 sports events in Europe
November 2019 sports events in Europe
December 2019 sports events in Europe